This is a list of the 24 members of the European Parliament for Portugal in the 2004 to 2009 session.

List

Notes

2004
List
Portugal